This is a list of notable restaurants in South Africa.

List of restaurants

B
 Burger King

C
 Chicken Licken

D
 Dulce Café
 Dominos pizza
 Debonairs Pizza

H 
 The Hussar Grill

J 
 John Dory's

K
 KFC
 Krispy Kreme
 Kauai
 Kream

M
 McDonald's
 Mugg & Bean
 Mzoli's
 Mozambik
 Mexican grills
 Mochachos

N
 Nando's
 News Cafe

P 
Panarottis
Pizza Hut
Popeyes
 Papachinos

R
Roman's Pizza
RocoMamas
 The Radium Beerhall

S
 Spur
 Steers
 Subway

V 
 Vida e Caffè

W 
 Wimpy

See also

 Lists of restaurants
 South African cuisine

References 

Lists of companies of South Africa
South Africa

South African cuisine-related lists